Skowhegan is a census-designated place (CDP) in the town of Skowhegan in Somerset County, Maine, in the United States. The population was 6,696 at the 2000 census.

Geography
Skowhegan is located at  (44.770308, −69.715087).

According to the United States Census Bureau, the CDP has a total area of 14.1 square miles (36.5 km), of which, 13.4 square miles (34.7 km) of it is land and 0.7 square miles (1.8 km) of it (5.04%) is water. Skowhegan is drained by the Wesserunsett Stream and Kennebec River.

Demographics

As of the census of 2000, there were 6,696 people, 2,883 households, and 1,764 families residing in the CDP. The racial makeup of the CDP was 97.66% White, 0.24% Black or African American, 0.45% Native American, 0.52% Asian, 0.16% from other races, and 0.97% from two or more races. Hispanic or Latino of any race were 0.70% of the population.

There were 2,883 households, out of which 28.2% had children under the age of 18 living with them, 42.5% were married couples living together, 14.4% had a female householder with no husband present, and 38.8% were non-families. 31.9% of all households were made up of individuals, and 13.1% had someone living alone who was 65 years of age or older. The average household size was 2.24 and the average family size was 2.76.

In the CDP, the population was spread out, with 22.5% under the age of 18, 8.6% from 18 to 24, 27.7% from 25 to 44, 22.9% from 45 to 64, and 18.2% who were 65 years of age or older. The median age was 39 years. For every 100 females, there were 88.6 males. For every 100 females age 18 and over, there were 84.5 males.

The median income for a household in the CDP was $26,726, and the median income for a family was $33,081. Males had a median income of $26,484 versus $20,714 for females. The per capita income for the CDP was $14,742. About 13.9% of families and 17.4% of the population were below the poverty line, including 23.3% of those under age 18 and 12.4% of those age 65 or over.

References

External links
 Town of Skowhegan, Maine
 Skowhegan Free Public Library

Skowhegan, Maine
Census-designated places in Maine
Census-designated places in Somerset County, Maine